Szilveszter Csollány (13 April 1970 – 24 January 2022) was a Hungarian gymnast who won gold in the men's rings at the 2000 Summer Olympics in Sydney.

Life and career
Csollány won gold in the men's rings at the 2000 Summer Olympics in Sydney with a score of 9.85. This achievement earned him the title 2000 Hungarian Sportsman of the Year. He was again chosen as Sportsman of the Year in 2002 after winning a gold medal at that year's World Artistic Gymnastics Championships.

Csollány moved to Iceland in 2011 and became a gymnastics coach at Grótta.

Death
In November 2021, Csollány contracted an undisclosed variant of SARS-CoV-2. According to his doctor, he was given the Janssen COVID-19 vaccine two weeks before he fell ill. This vaccine requires only one dose. Csollány had previously been critical of vaccination, but finally decided to get vaccinated because of a job abroad.
He was hospitalised with COVID-19 in mid-November 2021, and put on a ventilator. His condition became more serious in late November and he was transported from Sopron in Western Hungary to a hospital in the Hungarian capital Budapest.

Achievements
 Olympic Games
 6th place 1992 Barcelona men's rings
 Silver medal 1996 Atlanta men's rings
 Gold medal 2000 Sydney men's rings
 World Championships
 Gold medal 2002 Debrecen men's rings
 Silver medal 1992 Paris, 1996 San Juan, 1997 Lausanne, 1999 Tianjin, 2001 Ghent men's rings
 European Championships
 Gold medal 1998 men's rings
 Silver medal 2000 men's rings
 Bronze medal 1990, 1992, 1994, 2002 men's rings
 Awards and decorations
 Outstanding Youth Sportsman (1989)
 Golden Cross of Merit of the Republic of Hungary (1996)
 Hungarian Gymnast of the Year (1996, 1997, 1998, 1999, 2000, 2001, 2002)
 Hungarian Sportsman of the Year (2000, 2002)
 Officer's Cross of the Order of Merit of the Republic of Hungary (2000)
 Dunaferr Award (2000)
 Immortal of Hungarian Gymnastics (2009)
 Hungarian Tolerance Award (2011)

References

External links
 

1970 births
2022 deaths
Deaths from the COVID-19 pandemic in Hungary
Gymnasts at the 1992 Summer Olympics
Gymnasts at the 1996 Summer Olympics
Gymnasts at the 2000 Summer Olympics
Gymnastics coaches
Hungarian expatriate sportspeople in Austria
Hungarian male artistic gymnasts
Medalists at the 1996 Summer Olympics
Medalists at the 2000 Summer Olympics
Medalists at the World Artistic Gymnastics Championships
Officer's Crosses of the Order of Merit of the Republic of Hungary (civil)
Olympic gold medalists for Hungary
Olympic gymnasts of Hungary
Olympic medalists in gymnastics
Olympic silver medalists for Hungary
People from Sopron
World champion gymnasts
Sportspeople from Győr-Moson-Sopron County